Reinhard Rack (born 7 August 1945 in Leoben, Styria) is an Austrian politician and a former Member of the European Parliament (1995–2009). He is a member of the Austrian People's Party, which is part of the European People's Party, and was sitting on the European Parliament's Committee on Transport and Tourism.

He was also a substitute for the Committee on Constitutional Affairs, a member of the delegation for relations with Australia and New Zealand, and a substitute for the delegation for relations with Japan.

Career
 Studied law and interpreting at the University of Graz (1964-1968)
 Dr.jur
 Qualified translator
 University assistant (1968)
 Postdoctoral lecturing qualification (1976)
 University professor in constitutional, administrative and European law (since 1980)
 Visiting professor, Rutgers University, Camden/New Jersey (1985 and 1988)
 Academic publications in Austria and abroad
 Visiting lecturer, University of Malaysia (UMESP), Kuala Lumpur (2001)
 Spokesman on European affairs for the Land of Styria (1990-1994)
 Member of the Nationalrat (1994-1995 and in 1996)
 Member of the European Parliament (1995-2009)
 ÖVP Head of Delegation (1995-1996)
 Vice-Chairman, Group of the European People's Party, European Parliament (1996-1999)
 Vice-Chairman, EPP-ED Group, European Parliament
 Member, Convention for drafting a European Charter of Fundamental Human Rights (1999-2000)
 Member, Convention on the Future of Europe (2002-2003)
 Member, Austria Convention (since 2003

External links
 Official website (in German)
 European Parliament biography
 Declaration of financial interests (in German; PDF file)

1945 births
Living people
Austrian People's Party MEPs
MEPs for Austria 1996–1999
MEPs for Austria 1999–2004
MEPs for Austria 2004–2009